Invisible Life is a novel by American author E. Lynn Harris self-published in 1991, before being taken up by Anchor Books in 1994. The plot follows an African American man's journey of sexual discovery, in which he realizes he is a homosexual. In 2010, the Los Angeles Times listed the novel as one of the top 20 "classic works of gay literature" ever written.

Plot
Raymond Winston Tyler Jr, is a sexy green eyed black man in a white dominated workplace. As a lawyer he knows the good things in life, but what obstacles did it take to get there.
Brought up in Birmingham, Alabama. The story starts in the 1980s: he's in his senior year at the University of Alabama, he has the perfect life. He's popular and dating the only black cheerleader on campus, Sela. Things change when fate introduces him to star football player Kelvin Ellis. After a long drive together in which the two go to retrieve some beer, Kelvin reveals that he is bisexual and asks if Raymond is open to new things. Raymond retreats but soon finds himself in a forced kiss with Kelvin. They then proceed to have sex in his dorm room. Kelvin assures him that after one time with a man won't make him gay. In good time; Raymond finds himself continuing this relationship with Kelvin, and Sela until Kelvin insist that he live a heterosexual life, and they part ways. After graduating with his undergraduate degree he decides to pursue his grad years at Columbia University and parts ways with Sela.

Years in the future. Raymond is still in the closet, or living an invisible life as he calls it. His life consist of his friends JJ (a one-night stand in his past), and Kyle an openly gay man that Raymond deems his best friend. The story starts with a usual pastime in which Kyle and Raymond converse at gay bars and then meet up with JJ for dinner. Kyle, the more promiscuous of the two, picks up a man and also introduces a man which Raymond finds quite attractive. They finally meet again, to the point of going to Raymond's house. He soon reveals himself as Quinn Mathis. They begin to have a sexual and indoor relationship, until Raymond finds a wedding ring in his bed. Quinn reveals that he is married but at the point of divorce. Raymond unsure complies. During a regular visit to Kyle's apartment he finds a muscular grey eyed man caressing him. Raymond at the time confused but knows he looks familiar. He goes home to watch ESPN  to find that it  is no other than Mr. John Basil Henderson, football player for the Warriors. Quinn assures him that a lot of athletes fool around (Quinn was college baller who had his first experience with a man).
During Christmas shopping for Kyle and his family, he runs into an old flame, Kelvin. Kelvin is not only married but is a football coach in another city. The wife being oblivious to how they know each other suggests that they should get together sometime. Raymond also makes a visit back to his hometown. His family who is aware of his sexuality (except his little brother Kirby) welcomes him. His mother does; his father is not as welcoming to have a gay son and distances himself. He also hears that his hth (hometown honey) Sela is getting married. He soon meets up with her and has dinner. They exchange stories and they have reminiscent sex and express that their love hasn't changed and part ways. Back in New York, Quinn and Raymond begin to have more public activities as they feel more comfortable, and in secret Raymond is falling for him. Raymond questions Kyle about Basil with no avail. he soon runs into Basil and they talk. Although very handsome in every way. He is found to be very homophobic and in his right mind considers himself straight. He also admits that the way Raymond presents himself (non gay looking) makes him attractive, along with his looks. He also tells Raymond that only Kyle should tell him why they were meeting.
The Kelvin family agree to a dinner with Raymond and bring a guest, Miss Nicole Springer, a broadway singer in the making. Raymond finds himself very attracted to her. To even the extent of Quinn and him hanging out less. After a passionate night, Nicole and he make love. Raymond feels that he is only in love with a man's body not the man itself and that he can kill his gay behavior.
At one point in the story, Kelvin and Raymond are alone. He insists that he marry Nicole so they can pursue a relationship, Raymond is appalled and storms off. Also, he gets in argument with his father on his sexuality and how he should be with Nicole.
Soon it's revealed that Kelvin's wife is sick and has AIDS. Raymond is contemplating telling Nicole that he is abstaining from men and that they should get married. Nicole asks if Kelvin was a DL male to which Raymond refuses to answer and then comes clean to which scares Nicole off (thinking she might share kelvin's wife candace's fate). It is also revealed that Kelvin has run way and can't be contacted.

Raymond goes home drunk and is comforted by Quinn, whom he had already called off telling him to stay with his wife. He also reconciles with his father whom visits after he does not answer his calls. He tells him that he may not he happy with his gayness, but he loves him dearly. Kyle reveals later that Basil requested him from an escort service. Raymond and Nicole reconcile through a promise of an AIDS test. The story ends in a letter from the beginning of the story that never reveals who it is being sent to. It is revealed that it is to Nicole, speaking of the possibilities of a perfect world.

Television series
In May 2021, it was reported that HBO was in developing a television adaptation of novels. It will be produced by Harrison David Rivers, Proteus Spann and Tracy Edmonds.

References

External links

Invisible Life at E. Lynn Harris' Web site

1991 American novels
American young adult novels
Novels by E. Lynn Harris
Novels set in Alabama
Novels with gay themes
University of Alabama
1990s LGBT novels
American LGBT novels
Anchor Books books